William Hubert Miller Jr. (September 1932 – November 4, 1988), of New York City, was an aerophilatelist who published philatelic literature on the subject.

Philatelic literature
Miller specialized in the collection and study of air mail stamps, but especially postage stamps and postal history related to Zeppelin flights and Pigeon Posts. As a result of his studies, Miller wrote articles in the philatelic press on various aspects of aerophilately.

Philatelic activity
Miller was vice president of the American Air Mail Society in 1973 and continued on with the society as general counsel and a director until 1985.  He served as chairman of the Philatelic Foundation and as president of the Council of Philatelic Organizations for a number of years. In addition he served in a number of positions at the Collectors Club of New York.

Honors and awards
Miller was awarded the Neinken Medal in 1985 and the Lichtenstein Medal in 1985. He was elected to the American Philatelic Society Hall of Fame in 1989.

Legacy
According to the Scott Postage Stamp Catalog, air mail postage stamps were issued by postal authorities during the first half of the 20th century and discontinued during the decades after World War II. Miller’s philatelic literature helps illustrate this period of aerophilately within the field of philately.

See also
 Philately
 Philatelic literature

References
 William Hubert Miller Jr.

1932 births
1988 deaths
Philatelic literature
American philatelists
People from New York City
American Philatelic Society